are the simplified forms of kanji used in Japan since the promulgation of the Tōyō Kanji List in 1946. Some of the new forms found in shinjitai are also found in Simplified Chinese characters, but shinjitai is generally not as extensive in the scope of its modification.

This simplification was achieved through a process (similar to that of simplified Chinese) of either replacing the onpu ("sound mark") indicating the On reading with another onpu of the same On reading with fewer strokes, or replacing a complex component of a character with a simpler one.

There have been a few stages of simplifications made since the 1950s, but the only changes that became official were the changes in the Jōyō Kanji List in 1981 and 2010.

Background
The following forms were established as a result of the post-war character reforms. However, they were not completely created anew, as many were based on widely used handwritten abbreviations (ryakuji) from the prewar era. Due to the complexity of kanji, many abbreviations were used in handwriting, whose status rose to become official characters in the post-war reforms. Attention was paid to the aesthetic balance of the characters in their new form.

In almost all cases, characters in the new standard have fewer strokes than old forms, though in a few cases they have the same number, and in a few other cases they have one more stroke. The most drastic simplification was 廳→庁, removing 20 strokes. A complete list by stroke count reduction can be found at:

Unofficial simplifications

However, they are to be seen as unofficial, a position reiterated in the National Language Council's 2000 report on Characters Not Listed in the Jōyō Kanji Table.

The Asahi Shimbun newspaper is thorough in its simplification of hyōgaiji, and its in-house simplifications are called Asahi characters.
This is also said to have been done because in the age of typewriter-based printing, more complicated kanji could not be clearly printed.

Methods of simplifying Kanji

Adoption of grass script forms

Cursive script (also known as grass script) and semi-cursive script forms of kanji were adopted as shinjitai. Examples include:

 (religion/ceremony radical) →

Standardization and unification of character forms

Characters in which there were two or more variants were standardized under one form. The 辶 radical was previously printed with two dots (as in the hyōgaiji ) but was written with one (as in ), so the written form with one dot became standard.

Change of character indicating On reading

Characters of the keisei moji group each contain a semantic component and a phonetic component. A choice was made to replace the phonetic parts with homophones which had fewer strokes.

Other simplifications of this method include .

Adoption of variant characters
In some cases a standard character was replaced by a variant character that neither is a graphical variant nor shares an On reading, but had a historical basis for standardisation. In both cases the variant character had a different meaning  and reading but was adopted due to its lower stroke count anyway.

Removal of components
Some kanji were simplified by removing entire components. For example,

Adding a stroke
In five basic cases and six derivations for a total of eleven cases, kanji were modified by adding a stroke, thereby rendering the composition more regular:
 (→) – the bottom component becomes the common . However, the character 捗 was not modified (Compare with the section "Inconsistencies").
  – similarly
 　() – the bottom becomes 
 　() – the top right becomes 
  – formerly the middle stroke was part of the lower left stroke, now these are separate, so the lower two strokes form the common 

Inconsistencies
Simplification was not carried out uniformly. Firstly, only a select group of characters (the common jōyō kanji) was simplified, with characters outside this group (the hyōgaiji) generally retaining their earlier form.

Secondly, even when a simplification was done in some characters within this group, the analogous simplification was not applied to all characters. For instance, the character , meaning "dragon", was simplified in isolation and in some compound characters, but not others.

The latest 2010 jōyō kanji reform has added additional inconsistencies in this regard as in some instances radicals that were previously uniformly simplified across the jōyō set now first appeared in their traditional variants in some of the new jōyō characters; contrary to prior practice no new simplifications of characters have been carried out, likely in consideration of established JIS character set use spanning decades at this point. Compare  →  ("drink") to 2010 jōyō  ("fodder, bait"), or  →  ("coin") to 2010 jōyō  ("label"). For the latter an analogically simplified  character does exist, but was likely ignored due to having no history of use in Japanese character sets.

Nevertheless, the guidelines published by the Japanese government explicitly permit simplification in handwriting, and do not object to use of alternate characters in electronic text.

Simplifications in Jōyō Kanji and Jinmeiyō Kanji
In the 2,136 Jōyō Kanji, there are 364 pairs of simplified and traditional characters. Note that the kanji 弁 is used to simplify three different traditional kanji (辨, 瓣, and 辯). Of these 364 traditional characters, 212 are still used as Jinmeiyō Kanji in names. The Jinmeiyō Kanji List also includes 631 kanji that are not elements of the Jōyō Kanji List; 18 of them have a variant.
For a list of traditional and modern forms of Jōyō Kanji and Jinmeiyō Kanji, see Kyūjitai.

Some of the traditional kanji are not included in the Japanese font of Windows XP/2000, and only rectangles are shown. Downloading the Meiryo font from the Microsoft website (VistaFont_JPN.EXE) and installing it will solve this problem.

Traditional characters that may cause problems displaying

Note that within the Jōyō Kanji there are 62 characters whose old forms may cause problems displaying:

Kyōiku Kanji (26):

 Grade 2 (2 kanji): 
 Grade 3 (8 kanji): 
 Grade 4 (6 kanji): 
 Grade 5 (1 kanji): 
 Grade 6 (9 kanji): 

Secondary-School Kanji (36):

 Secondary School (36 kanji): 

These characters are Unicode CJK Unified Ideographs for which the old form (kyūjitai) and the new form (shinjitai) have been unified under the Unicode standard. Although the old and new forms are distinguished under the JIS X 0213 standard, the old forms map to Unicode CJK Compatibility Ideographs which are considered by Unicode to be canonically equivalent to the new forms and may not be distinguished by user agents. Therefore, depending on the user environment, it may not be possible to see the distinction between old and new forms of the characters. In particular, all Unicode normalization methods merge the old characters with the new ones.

Controversies
Like one of the controversial aspects of simplified Chinese, some shinjitai were originally separate characters with different meanings. However,  poses a problem, in that Japan's first public library, Untei (built during the Nara Period) uses this character. This character also has significance in classical Japanese literature, and Japanese history books have had to distinguish between the two by writing UN using the old form of the 艹 radical, (艸).

Differences in simplification between Chinese and Japanese

Mainland China, Singapore, Malaysia and Japan simplified their writing systems independently from each other. After World War II, poor relations prevented cooperation between the two nations. Traditional Chinese characters are still officially used in Hong Kong, Macau, Taiwan, South Korea (as a supplement to Hangul, but they are no longer used in North Korea), and by many overseas Chinese.

In Chinese, many more characters were simplified than in Japanese; some characters were simplified only in the one language, but not in the other; other characters were simplified in the same way in both languages, others in different ways. This means that those who want to learn the writing systems of both Chinese and Japanese must sometimes learn three different variations of one character: traditional Chinese, simplified Chinese, and modern Japanese (e.g. for "dragon").

See also

References

External links

 Kanji - Japanese Simplifications
 The 20th Century Japanese Writing System: Reform and Change by Christopher Seeley

Glyph conversion
 A simple Shinjitai - Kyūjitai converter
 A practical Shinjitai - Kyūjitai - Simplified Chinese character converter
 A complex Shinjitai - Kyūjitai converter
 A downloadable Shinjitai - Kyūjitai - Simplified Chinese character converter

Japanese writing system terms